Jónsmessa, also known as Midsummer Night, is an Icelandic holiday celebrated on June 24. It is named after John the Baptist. According to Icelandic folklore, cows gain the powers of speech, seals become human, and it is healthy to roll naked in the dew-covered grass on Jónsmessa. Icelandic folklore also states that if you sit at a crossroads where all four roads lead to separate churches  all night, elves will attempt to seduce you with food and gifts.

References

External links
 "My Iceland: Midsummer Night", Iceland Weather Report, JUNE 23, 2008

Icelandic culture
June observances
Summer holidays (Northern Hemisphere)